Meir Heath is a village just to the south of Stoke-on-Trent, Staffordshire situated on a hilltop between Meir and Rough Close, 2½ miles from Barlaston and only 5 miles from Stone. The population as taken at the 2011 census can be found under the ward of Fulford, Stoke-on-Trent.

It is located in the Borough of Stafford.

Meir Heath is said to be the highest conurbation in Staffordshire, due to its altitude it often experiences higher than the locally average snow fall probably attributed to its windy nature and snow drifts, hence the reason for locating the windmill there.

The village features a well known public house named The Windmill, the car park of which contains a windmill with a new boat cap, door new windows new beams making it safe to go inside.

Meir Heath Cricket Club was formed in 1946 and continues to offer cricket tuition to boys and girls of all ages. The club also features men's and women's teams who continue the club's successful profile.

External links

Villages in Staffordshire